Seven Clans Casinos is a tribal gaming enterprise which is owned and operated by Red Lake Nation, and consists of three casinos: Seven Clans Casino Red Lake, Seven Clans Casino Warroad, and Seven Clans Casino Thief River Falls.  Red Lake Nation also operates the Super 8 and Lakeview Restaurant in Warroad, Minnesota.  Seven Clans Casinos is operated under Red Lake Gaming Enterprises and is licensed under the Red Lake Gaming Commission.

External links 

Casinos in Minnesota
Native American casinos
Native American history of Minnesota